Richard Leishman (born 17 October 1969) is a British swimmer. He competed in two events at the 1992 Summer Olympics.

References

External links
 

1969 births
Living people
British male swimmers
Olympic swimmers of Great Britain
Swimmers at the 1992 Summer Olympics
Sportspeople from Halifax, West Yorkshire